Valles may refer to:

Places
Interandean Valles, a region that is home to most of the human population and agricultural production of the central Andes of Peru, Bolivia, and northwest Argentina
Vallès, a region in Catalonia, Spain, comprising the comarques of Vallès Occidental and Vallès Oriental
Vallés, Valencia, a town in the Valencian Community, Spain
Valles Caldera, New Mexico, United States

People
Jules Vallès (1832-1885), French writer and political activist
Arlington Valles (1886-1970), Oscar-winning costume designer
Judith Valles (born 1933), mayor of San Bernardino and educator
Mario Valles (born 1977), Colombian judoka
Max Valles (born 1994), American football player
Hakeem Valles, (born 1992), American football player